Rebecca Eileen Dempster (born 10 February 1991) is a Scottish footballer who plays as a forward for Italian club Fimauto Valpolicella. She has made three appearances for the Scotland national team.

Early life
Dempster grew up in Ellon, Aberdeenshire, and was educated at Ellon Academy.

Playing career

Club
Dempster played for Inverness City before joining Celtic in 2009. After a spell with Forfar Farmington, she joined Hibernian ahead of the 2011 season. on 25 May 2011, she was part of the Hibernian team that won the Scottish Women's Premier League Cup, beating Spartans 5–2 in the final.

In 2012, Dempster joined Aberdeen, where she played for three seasons. She then spent a year out of official football before signing for Fimauto Valpolicella in Italy in 2016. In her first season, Valpolicella won promotion from Serie B.

International
Dempster made her debut for the Scotland under-17 team against Sweden in September 2007, going on to make four appearances at that level. She then progressed to the under-19 squad, where she scored twelve goals in eleven appearances, including a hat-trick in a 5–1 win against Bulgaria in September 2009. At the 2010 European Championships, she scored three times in three matches.

Dempster was given her first call-up to the full Scotland squad in 2010. She won her first international cap in a friendly match against France on 18 May 2011. She made further appearances against Northern Ireland and Cameroon in 2012.

Honours

Club
Hibernian:
 Scottish Women's Premier League Cup: 2011

Fimauto Valpolicella:
 Serie B Group C: 2016–17

References

External links
 
 

Living people
1991 births
People from Ellon, Aberdeenshire
Women's association football forwards
Scottish women's footballers
Scotland women's international footballers
Celtic F.C. Women players
Hibernian W.F.C. players
People educated at Ellon Academy
Expatriate women's footballers in Italy
Scottish expatriate sportspeople in Italy
Scottish expatriate women's footballers
Forfar Farmington F.C. players
Footballers from Aberdeenshire
Aberdeen F.C. Women players